The Lamborghini Diablo is a high-performance mid-engine sports car  built by Italian automobile manufacturer Lamborghini between 1990 and 2001. After the end of its production run in 2001, the Diablo was replaced by the Lamborghini Murciélago. 
The name Diablo means "devil" in Spanish.

History of development

At a time when the company was financed by the Swiss-based brothers Jean Claude and Patrick Mimran, Lamborghini began development of what was codenamed Project 132 in June 1985 as a replacement for the Countach, Lamborghini's then flagship sports car. The brief stated that the top speed of the new car had to be at least .

The design of the car was contracted to Marcello Gandini, who had designed its two predecessors. When Chrysler Corporation bought the company in 1987, funding the company to complete the car's development, its management was uncomfortable with Gandini's designs and commissioned its design team in Detroit to execute a third extensive redesign, smoothing out the infamous sharp edges and corners of Gandini's original design, and leaving him famously unimpressed. In fact, Gandini was so disappointed with the "softened" shape that he would later realise his original design in the Cizeta-Moroder V16T.

The new car was named Diablo, carrying on Lamborghini's tradition of naming its cars after breeds of fighting bulls. The Diablo was named after a ferocious bull raised by the Duke of Veragua in the 19th century, famous for fighting an epic battle with 'El Chicorro' in Madrid on 11 July 1869.

The development is believed to have cost a total of 6 billion Lire .

1990–1998

Diablo

The Diablo was presented to the public for sale on 21 January 1990. The Diablo was rear-wheel drive and the engine was mid-mounted to aid its weight balance. Auto Motor und Sport measured 0- in 4.5 seconds, 0- in 9.3 seconds and 0- in 13.7 seconds.

The Diablo came better equipped than the Countach; standard features included fully adjustable seats and steering wheel, electric windows, an Alpine stereo system, and power steering from 1993 onwards. Anti-lock brakes were not initially available, although they would eventually be used. A few options were available, including a custom-molded driver's seat, remote CD changer and subwoofer, rear spoiler, factory fitted luggage set (priced at $2,600) and an exclusive Breguet clock for the dash (priced at $10,500).

Diablo Roadster Concept

Introduced at the 1992 Geneva Motor Show, the Diablo roadster concept showcased what a possible open top version of the car would look like. The roof was removed and the car had a shortened visor in place of the windshield which made its way to the doors indicating the adaptation of the barchetta body style. The chassis was strengthened in order to compensate for the loss of the roof and the car featured many unique components some of which made their way to the later variants of the Diablo. Such components included larger air intakes near the rear wing and the sides of the car for better engine cooling, a visor mounted rear view mirror, roll bars over the seats, unique wheels in body colour of the car and a unique engine cover which included a tunnel in the middle for better airflow over the rear view mirror. The signature scissor doors were retained despite the loss of the roof and the interior became more ergonomic and featured a unique two-tone beige colour. The concept generated a positive response among the public and demand among customers for such a car. As the car was not intended for production, German tuner Koenig Specials, with Lamborghini's permission, converted customer cars into replicas of the concept. The cars featured different front and rear bumpers along with wheels than that of the concept due to copyright issues along with an upgraded engine. The conversion was no longer offered upon the request of Lamborghini as the company introduced the Diablo VT roadster in 1995.

Diablo VT

The Diablo VT was introduced in 1993. Although the VT differed from the standard Diablo in a number of ways, by far the most notable change was the addition of all wheel drive, which made use of a viscous center differential (a modified version of LM002's 4WD system). This provided the new nomenclature for the car (VT stands for viscous traction). The new drivetrain could direct up to 25% of the torque to the front wheels to aid traction during rear wheel slip, thus significantly improving the handling characteristics of the car.

Other improvements debuting on the VT included front air intakes below the driving lamps to improve brake cooling, larger intakes in the rear arches, a more ergonomic interior with revised electronically adjustable dampers, four-piston brake calipers, power steering and minor engine refinements.  Many of these improvements, save the four-wheel drive system, soon transferred to the base Diablo, making the cars visually nearly identical.

Diablo SE30 and SE30 Jota

The Diablo SE30 was introduced in 1993 as a limited-production special model to commemorate the company's 30th anniversary. The car was designed largely as a street-legal race vehicle that was lighter and more powerful than the standard Diablo. The car remained rear-wheel drive to save weight, and omitted the electrically adjustable shock absorbers of the VT model, but was equipped with adjustable-stiffness anti-roll bars which could be controlled from the interior, on the fly.

The car's weight was lowered by replacing the power glass side windows with fixed plexiglas (with a small sliding vent window as on many race cars) and removing luxury features such as the air conditioning, stereo, and power steering. Carbon fibre seats with 4-point race harnesses and a fire suppression system added to the race nature of the vehicle.

On the outside, the SE30 differed from other Diablo models with a revised front fascia featuring straked brake cooling ducts and a deeper spoiler, while the rear cooling ducts were changed to a vertical body-colored design. The raging bull emblem was moved from the front of the luggage lid to the nose panel of the car between the front indicators. The engine lid had slats covering the narrow rear window, while a larger spoiler was installed as standard equipment. The single rear fog lamp and rear backup lamp, which had been on either side of the rear grille, were moved into the bumper; this change would be applied to all Diablo models across the lineup. Completing the exterior variations were special magnesium alloy wheels, SE30 badging, and a new metallic purple paint color (this could be changed upon request).

Only 150 SE30 models were built, and of these, about 15 were converted to "Jota" specification (although 28 Jota kits were produced). The "Jota" was a factory modification kit designed to convert the race-oriented SE30 into an actual circuit racer, albeit at the cost of street-legal operation. A revised engine lid with two ducts protruding above the roofline forced air into the intake system; a similar lid design would later be used on the Diablo SV model. The rear-view mirror from the interior was also removed because it was completely useless in conjunction with the revised engine lid, further adding to the race feeling of the car.

Acceleration (Test By Hot Rod Magazine) 

0-: 1.8 sec

0-: 3.3 sec

0-: 4.9 sec

0-: 7.0 sec

0-: 9.9 sec

0-: 11.4 sec @ 128.5 mph

: 8.1 sec

Diablo SV

The Diablo SV was introduced in 1995 at the Geneva Motor Show, reviving the Super Veloce title first used on the Miura SV. The SV is based on the standard Diablo and thus lacks the four-wheel drive system of the VT. Despite its higher power output, the SV was priced as the entry-level model in the Diablo range, falling below the standard Diablo by a small margin. An adjustable rear spoiler was installed as standard equipment and could be color-matched to the car body or formed from carbon fibre. Other exterior changes included black tail lamp surrounds, repositioned rear fog and reverse lamps as on the SE30, dual front fog lamps (rather than the quad style found on all previous models), an extra set of front brake cooling ducts, an engine lid similar to that installed on the Diablo SE30 Jota, and optional "SV" decals for the sides of the car. The SV also featured larger diameter front brakes and a corresponding increase in front wheel size to 18 inches.

In 1998, a limited 20-car run of the Diablo SV was produced exclusively for the United States market and called the Monterey Edition. The most notable feature of this edition was the use of the SE30/VT Roadster style of air intakes in front of the rear wheels, unlike the traditional (and persisting) SV style. Several of the cars were painted in unusual, vibrant colours. One Monterey Edition, featuring an upgraded engine and brakes, was driven by Mario Andretti during the Lamborghini-sponsored "Running of the Bulls" event in California.

Need for Speed III: Hot Pursuit uses the Lamborghini Diablo SV as the flagship car of the game. The car became emblematic of the Need for Speed franchise, making several appearances throughout later entries in the series.

Diablo VT Roadster

The Diablo VT Roadster was introduced in December 1995 and featured an electronically operated carbon fibre targa top which was stored above the engine lid when not in use. Besides the roof, the roadster's body was altered from the fixed-top VT model in a number of ways. The front bumper was revised, replacing the quad rectangular driving lamps with two rectangular and two round units.
The brake cooling ducts were moved inboard of the driving lamps and changed to a straked design, while the rear ducts featured the vertical painted design seen on the SE30.

The engine lid was changed substantially in order to vent properly when the roof panel was covering it. The roadster also featured revised 17 inch wheels. The air intakes on top/sides were made larger than the Diablo coupé.

Specifications

Facelift (1999–2001)

Diablo SV (1999)

The Diablo received a mid-cycle facelift in 1999. Lamborghini simplified the model range by eliminating the "base" Diablo (since the SV model had become the new entry-level trim) and applied universal revisions across the lineup.  The most immediately noticeable exterior change was the replacement of the previous Diablo's pop-up headlamp units with fixed composite lenses, borrowed under license from their original application in the Nissan 300ZX (Z32). All models were also fitted with new 18 inch wheels.

The Diablo range also received an updated interior. Instead of the traditional flat dashboard with a separate upright instrument binnacle, as in many Italian sports cars of the era (and the outgoing Diablo), the new dashboard was an integrated wave-shaped design. A thin strip of black glass ran the length of the dash and contained various instrument indicator and warning lamps. This aesthetic design was inspired by Bang & Olufsen Hi-Fi products.

For the first time in a Lamborghini, the Diablo was equipped with a Kelsey-Hayes ABS system, complementing larger diameter brake rotors.

Diablo VT and VT Roadster (1999)

The second generation of the VT coupé and roadster received the same cosmetic and mechanical upgrades as the SV model, including the open headlamps, restyled interior,  engine, and ABS; little else was changed from the previous generation. All US-spec VT models, coupé and roadster alike, shared the same unique front and rear fascias as seen on the original VT Roadster, along with the vertical painted rear brake ducts that had debuted on the SE30 model; these cosmetic variations were available as options on rest-of-world VT coupés.

A special run of twelve Diablo VT models was produced exclusively for the United States market in 1999 and called the Alpine Edition. As the Diablo had been utilising Alpine stereo equipment since its inception, this very limited production was intended to showcase and celebrate the Lamborghini/Alpine collaboration. The Alpine Edition was a standard Diablo VT with no engine modifications but having carbon fibre trim in various locations, but the big news was the multimedia system. The stereo receiver was the top-end CVA-1005 model, with integrated navigation system; also included in the package was a DVD player, 6-disc CD changer, and Alpine's top quality tweeters, midrange drivers, and subwoofers, powered by "Lamborghini" badged Alpine amplifiers. Alpine logos adorned the seat headrests, floor mats, and the special car cover included with this rare model.

Another special twelve-car run of VT models for the US market consisted of VT Roadsters and was called the Momo Edition. Like the Alpine Edition, the Momo Edition catered to the US car buyer's interest in aftermarket products. Lamborghini, rather than spending money to develop certain automotive components, had been using aftermarket suppliers such as Alpine and MOMO to outfit the Diablo. The Momo Edition was again a standard VT Roadster, but featured special upholstery, MOMO 4-point seatbelt harnesses, and MOMO chrome wheels. Like the Alpine Edition, the Momo Edition also had MOMO logos embroidered in the seat headrests and floor mats.

The VT Roadster enjoyed one final limited run of 30 cars for the 2000 model year, after the introduction of the Diablo VT 6.0 (see below).  This "Millennium Roadster" model was available in just two colors, Titanium Metallic and yellow, with the 10 cars exported to the United States all finished in Titanium Metallic. Besides an optional carbon fiber spoiler, special two-tone leather interior, and the shorter-ratio SV rear differential (providing enhanced acceleration), this model featured no significant changes from the previous design, and merely served as a final tribute to the outgoing roadster.

Diablo GT

Lamborghini introduced the Diablo GT in 1998 based on the formula of the SE30 and the SE30 Jota of which only 80 examples were produced for sale. The Diablo GT was a track oriented iteration of the Diablo and featured many unique components exclusive to the model. The GT fitted with radically altered aggressive bodywork, a stripped-down interior, and an enlarged engine. The GT variant was exclusive to Europe only but some were imported into the US.

Exterior changes included an all new black carbon fibre front air dam with large brake ducts and a central vent for the oil cooler (the car still featured driving lamps, the single pair of round units featured on the Diablo VT Roadster). In the front luggage compartment lid, a large air extractor was added, while the small corner vents on the front wings were changed to NACA style ducts. The wings themselves were widened to accommodate a wider front track. In the rear, the bumper and its lamps were removed entirely, replaced by a carbon fibre diffuser which integrated the fog and reversing lamps into the outer pair of the tail lamps, and shielded a pair of large center-mounted exhaust pipes. The engine lid featured a large central ram air duct protruding above the roof; a rear spoiler was standard equipment. This radical new body was composed mostly of carbon fibre, with the steel roof and aluminum doors being the only components to retain their standard material. Special 3-piece OZ wheels finished the GT's exterior package.

Interior wise, the GT had more prominent carbon fibre panels, race-spec bucket seats with 4-point seatbelt harnesses, a smaller steering wheel, and an optional Alpine LCD screen for GPS navigation along with a bumper mounted reversing camera. Despite the racing pretenses of the model, air conditioning was still installed as standard equipment; airbags could be optionally omitted.

The transmission was the same 5-speed unit as used in other Diablo variants, but different gear ratios could be specified by the buyer. The car omitted the all-wheel-drive system to save weight.

Diablo VT 6.0 and VT 6.0 SE

In 1994, Chrysler left F1 and sold Lamborghini to a group of Indonesians. By 1998, Audi AG took over Lamborghini from its former Southeast Asian owners, MyCom and V'Power and set out to modernise and refine the Diablo, while its replacement, the Murciélago, was being developed. Audi tasked then Lamborghini chief designer Luc Donckerwolke to design a more refined and modern Diablo. The VT 6.0 as a result, featured significant styling changes both inside and out.

On the exterior, the VT 6.0 differed from its predecessors with a revised front fascia that featured two large air intakes (similar to those later used on the Murciélago). The air dam, nose panel, and wings were all reworked and smoothed, the indicators were enlarged and shifted in position, and the small air inlets in the tops of the wings were omitted. The rear of the car remained familiar, but the taillight surrounds were now body-colored (rather than transparent red or black) and the lamps themselves used the configuration seen on the track oriented GT variant. Aluminum 18 inch OZ wheels which were styled with a 5-hole "phone dial" design similar to that seen on the later models of the Countach were used. The interior was refined by improved air-conditioning and revised seat and pedal alignment.

The engine was shared with the limited production GT variant and had updated ECU software in addition to new intake and exhaust systems and a refined variable valve timing system with revised camshafts.

Due to the development of the Murciélago, the Diablo VT 6.0 was only available in coupé bodystyle with no more roadster or SV models planned; however, customers could specially order a rear-wheel drive version of the VT 6.0.

At the end of the Diablo's production run, the company introduced the limited production Diablo VT 6.0 SE.
This model was only available in two colours; the gold metallic "Oro Elios" represented sunrise, while the color-shifting bronze/maroon "Marrone Eklipsis" represented the sunset. Other changes include a new magnesium intake manifold, short-gear transmission, special upholstery treatment, "Lamborghini" badged brake calipers, comprehensive road map software in the navigation system, and enhanced carbon fibre trim on the interior. The power output remained the same as on the Diablo VT 6.0. Production was limited to 42 units.

Specifications

Factory racing specials

Diablo Jota GT1 LM

In early 1995, Lamborghini wanted to build the GT1 specs Diablo to compete in the 24 Hours of Le Mans. Amos Racing in the UK was contracted to develop the vehicle and have it ready in time for the June 1995 24h race, The Larrousse formula one team at the time also under contract with Lamborghini did the first testing and shake down on behalf of Lamborghini and Amos racing. Apparently just before the race an disagreement between the proposed entrant and the factory preventing the car from running and a legal dispute between them caused the project to end.

JGTC Diablo Jota or SE30 Jota R P-Series
In 1995, to enter in the JGTC racing in Japan, Japan Lamborghini Owners Club (JLOC) ordered Lamborghini to develop two competition cars with one road-going car in order to homologate the cars for racing. The cars were developed with technical support of Lamborghini Engineering and were allowed to be named Jota. All three cars exist in Japan.

The first car, the Jota PO.01, actually competed in JGTC series racing in 1995 and 1996 seasons. It has a dry-sump  engine with Multi Mode Engine Control (MMEC) technology which had been developed through Formula One challenge in the 1991 season. The second car, the Jota PO.02, was also developed in 1995 with specifications for endurance race, and competed in Suzuka 1000 km race. Although it was planned to enter 24 Hours of Le Mans, but due to unknown reasons, it did not compete. The third car, the Jota PO.03, has specifications for road use with dry-sump engine with MMMC.

Diablo GT1 Stradale
Following the foot-steps of Porsche in 1996 with the GT1, a purpose built racing car that created a stir in motorsports, Lamborghini contracted Signes Advanced Technologies (SAT), a company based in Toulon, France, specialising in manufacturing prototype race cars, to develop a racing version of the Diablo to enter in the GT1 class racing. The company would build an entirely new chassis made of tubular steel and a carbon fibre body bearing resemblance to the road going Diablo with Lamborghini supplying the engine and getting the project through homologation. The 5.7 L V12 engine used in the standard Diablo variants was stroked to a displacement of 6.0 L utilising a reprogrammed engine management system. The finished car weighed a total of  making it the lightest Diablo variant ever produced. The body work featured heavy modifications and little was shared with the road car. A very deep chin spoiler and fixed front lamps along with an adjustable rear wing was one of the main changes. The front and rear section of the car were entirely removable to allow easy access to the mechanicals of the car, the wheelbase and length of the car was increased than a standard Diablo for enhanced performance. Larger air intakes on the rear, NACA ducts near the doors and air intakes from the Diablo SV improved engine cooling. The car utilised scissor doors and tail lights from a regular Diablo further increasing its resemblance with the road going model. Other features included purpose built race interior, plexiglass windows, 18-inch centre-lock OZ racing wheels and an integrated roll-cage. The car was presented in 1997 to the factory in the presence of FIA representatives who approved and homologated the car for racing. But financial difficulties surrounding Lamborghini at that time forced the company to not go further with the project. Only 2 cars were built, one was meant for racing and one was the road legal version which dropped the rear wing. The racing version was bought by the JLOC racing team from Japan who used it in the JGTC series racing until the series was abandoned and the road version remained in the ownership of SAT until it was sold to Mistral Motors in Italy.

Diablo SV-R

Unveiled at the 1996 Geneva Motor Show, the Diablo SV-R is a lightweight competition version of the SV and the first Lamborghini to be officially built for motorsport purposes, as Ferruccio Lamborghini had never desired to build "street legal race cars" like rival Ferrari.  Rather than comply with the requirements for any established racing series, Lamborghini created its own Lamborghini Supertrophy which ran for four years (replaced later with the GTR Supertrophy for the Diablo GTR), with its inaugural round held as the support race to the 1996 24 Hours of Le Mans. The 28 Diablo SV-R's entered, which were built in 4 months on the Diablo assembly line along with production SV's, all finished this first event without significant problems.

The Diablo SV-R featured a stripped-down interior with a rollcage, racing seat, and removable steering wheel; the power glass side windows were replaced with fixed Plexiglass with traditional race-style sliding sections. On the exterior, the electric pop-up headlamps were replaced either with fixed units (similar to those which appeared later on the road cars in 1999) or with open ducting for the front brakes. A larger, deeper front spoiler was fitted, while the rear bumper was replaced with a diffuser assembly and the traditional Diablo "wing" was replaced with a true adjustable carbon fiber spoiler. Side skirts were added for aerodynamics, but this left so little ground clearance that pneumatic air jacks also had to be installed to raise the car for service in the pit lane; similar jacks can be seen in use on the more recent Ferrari F430 Challenge. Lightweight, hollow center-lock OZ wheels were used, although these were later switched to stronger Speedline units. Linear-rate springs were used with Koni shock absorbers and were adjusted to about twice the stiffness of stock Diablo SV suspension.

The engine was bolted up to a 6-speed manual transmission. Each car sold came with a season's factory support and an entry to the one-make series. All repairs and maintenance were carried out by Lamborghini themselves.

The series' first title winner was BPR regular, Thomas Bscher, who became involved with the business side of the brand in later years. In total, 31 examples of the SV-R were produced. Only a few of these have been modified for road use, including one in the United States which received a Diablo VT 6.0 front clip and was painted with the Stars and Stripes.

Diablo GT2

Following the success of the Diablo SV-R, Lamborghini decided to enter the Diablo in GT2 class racing. Primarily because of a failed attempt in 1996 to enter the famed GT1 class with the Diablo GT1 Stradale. A new car was developed based on the Diablo SV which later became the basis for the infamous Diablo GT and the Diablo GTR, the car was called the Diablo GT2 and it featured a detuned variant of the 6.0 L V12 engine used in the Diablo GT1 Stradale. The interior was stripped of all luxuries and featured a racing steering wheel with an integrated digital speedometer, fire extinguisher system, racing cut off switch, removable engine cover with quick release system, plexiglass windows with sliding sections, integrated roll-cage, fast filling fuel cell system instead of the conventional fuel tank, centre-lock wheels and a large CFRP fixed rear wing. Many features of the car were carried out to the Diablo GT along with later Lamborghini models such as the huge air intake at the front, removable engine covers, central dual exhaust system and the engine itself, which was detuned for road usage. The project was scrapped when Audi took over the company. The car was given an update sometime in 2002 and was known as the Diablo GT2 Evoluzione which included different front and rear bumpers, rear wing from the Diablo GTR and a modified air intake system for the engine, but the car never went racing.

Diablo GTR

After campaigning the Diablo SV-R for four years in the Diablo Supertrophy, Lamborghini launched a completely new car for the 2000 season.  Just as the SV-R was a race-ready SV, the Diablo GTR, introduced at the 1999 Bologna Motor Show, converted the Diablo GT to a track oriented car with power improvements, a stripped interior, and weight reduction.

The GTR interior was stripped down to save weight; the air conditioning, stereo, and sound and heatproofing were removed, and a single racing seat with 6-point seatbelt harness, MOMO fire suppression system and steering wheel, complete integrated roll cage, fixed Plexiglass windows with sliding sections, and fresh air intake were fitted.

The GT had already featured a radically styled body, but the GTR took this a little further with features such as a very large rear spoiler bolted directly to the chassis like a true race car, 18 inch hollow magnesium Speedline centerlock wheels, pneumatic air jacks for raising the car in the pit lane (like the SV-R, it was too low for a rolling jack), and an emergency fuel shutoff switch on the left front fender.

The GTR utilized the same basic 6.0-litre V12 engine that had made its debut on the street-legal GT, but with revised fuel and ignition systems, individual throttle bodies, a dynamic air intake duct system, variable valve timing, titanium connecting rods, and a lightened crankshaft. The engine was bolted to the usual 5-speed transmission in a rear-wheel drive layout. Extra heat exchangers were added for the differential and transmission oil to prevent overheating under extreme racing conditions. A fast-filling racing fuel cell replaced the standard gasoline tank. The suspension was stiffened and lowered, and racing brake calipers were installed.

Thirty cars were initially planned to be produced but actual production amounted to 40 units, and 40 chassis were prepared to replace cars wrecked in racing accidents.

In the hands of multiple Australian Drivers' Champion Paul Stokell, a Diablo GTR run by Team Lamborghini Australia won the 2003 and 2004 Australian Nations Cup Championships. The GTR was also raced by Stokell, Luke Youlden, Peter Hackett and Danish driver Allan Simonsen in the 2003 Bathurst 24 Hour race where after qualifying 6th would go on to finish 8th outright after suffering a number of punctures throughout the race.

Concept cars

Introduction 
In 1995, the ownership of Lamborghini was restructured. Indonesian company V'Power Corporation held 60 percent of the shareholding while the remaining 40 percent stake was controlled by a Malaysian company MyCom Bhd. The restructured ownership hired Vittorio Di Capua, an infamous automobile industry veteran, who had worked at Fiat S.p.A. for 40 years as the new president and CEO of the company, thus replacing Mike Kimberley who had disagreements with the shareholders. Di Capua, after taking the position, initiated a cost-cutting program that led to the departure of many executives and consultants. Under his guidance, the development of the aging Diablo's successor began under the code name P147 (later changed to L147). Di Capua made a decision to use the Diablo's chassis and running gear for the working prototypes in order to save development costs. This development program led to the development of two prototypes, named the Kanto and the Acosta.

Lamborghini Acosta (1996) 

Following his involvement in the development of famous Lamborghini models namely the Miura and the Countach, Marcello Gandini, who had now been operating his own design consultancy firm, was entrusted with the design of the Diablo's successor. The car called the Acosta was heavily based on the Diablo following the new management's policy and was Gandini's interpretation for a modern-day Lamborghini. The Acosta had a fairly angled design language when compared to the Kanto (shown below). The large rear cooling intakes were more smooth and were inline with the design language but were followed by equally large outlets at the rear of the car. The front of the car had two thin headlamps joined by a scaffolding which created a bulge on the hood, the bulge were also present on the engine cover to create more room for the engine harking back to the Countach, reducing rear visibility. The wing mirrors were two large units incorporating large openings for better airflow. There was also a small spoiler present on the small window at the rear of the car.

This design was considered too aggressive for a modern Lamborghini and that it was loosely based around the Diablo's design. It was ultimately rejected. The only car completed based on Gandini's design was left without any running gear and is now stored in the Lamborghini Museum.

Lamborghini Kanto (1997) 

After the rejection of Gandini's design, many design propositions were made for the Diablo's successor. Finally the design penned by Norihiko Harada, chief designer of Italian styling house Zagato was chosen.

The first running prototypes having Harada's design began testing in 1997. In the early stages of the car's development, the Kanto had utilised the engine taken from a Diablo SV before moving on to a more powerful and modified power plant.

When Lamborghini was sold to Audi in June 1998, the development work on the successor of the Diablo was overseen by Volkswagen Group president Ferdinand Piëch. He immediately rejected the design because he had been unimpressed by the design language, which was not as aggressive as previous Lamborghini models. He also reprimanded the big side air intakes present on rear of the car which disproportioned the overall look.

Keeping the suggestions in consideration, the car was heavily redesigned in 1999 and special attention was given to shorten the air intakes. The car was to be unveiled to the public at the 1999 Geneva Motor Show with plans of putting it into production but the car did not receive Piëch's approval, primarily due to his continuing dissatisfaction with the design along with the use of the Diablo's running gear and the project was shelved.

The Kanto had later utilised a modified version of the 6.0-litre V12 engine used in Diablo SV-R which generated a maximum power output of  during Dyno testing.

A claimed total of five cars are said to have been produced with one car (finished in black exterior colour) being sold to a Japanese collector. The Kanto concept having the Diablo SV-R powerplant now resides in the Lamborghini Museum.

Following the failure of the two concepts, Piëch initiated development work of the successor of the Diablo from scratch. The design work was entrusted to the then Lamborghini chief designer Luc Donckerwolke and thus the Murciélago was developed.

Production

Notes

External links

Flagship vehicles
Diablo
Roadsters
1990s cars
2000s cars
Rear mid-engine, all-wheel-drive vehicles
Rear mid-engine, rear-wheel-drive vehicles